Tony Weisman (born 1960) from United States is currently CEO of SnapPointLLC.  From 2017 to 2019, he was Chief Marketing Officer of Dunkin' Donuts  North America.

Early life

Weisman was born and raised in Chicago, and is a graduate of Brown University and an avid sailor on Lake Michigan.

Career
Tony Weisman was appointed on Sept 5, 2017 as the new Chief Marketing Officer of Dunkin' Donuts North America. During his tenure he helped the chain with its espresso launch and the test of its plant-based breakfast sandwich. He left Dunkin' on Dec 1, 2019. 

In 2007 Weisman joined advertising agency Digitas and in 2013 was elevated to Chief Executive Officer (North America) at DigitasLBi. While CEO he served as a member of its Global Executive Board and reported to Luke Taylor, global CEO of DigitasLBi. He replaced Colin Kinsella. 

Prior to Digitas, Weisman was chief marketing officer at DraftFCB Chicago. He also held various management positions at Leo Burnett.

Honours and awards
He has received a Silver Medal Awardee 2015, an award from Chicago Advertising Federation

References

1960 births
Living people
People from Chicago
Brown University alumni